Rajah Martheze (29 November 1877 – 16 February 1912) was a South African international rugby union player who played as a forward.

He made 3 appearances for South Africa from 1903 - 1906.

References

South African rugby union players
South Africa international rugby union players
1877 births
1912 deaths
Rugby union forwards
Griquas (rugby union) players
People from the City of Cape Town